Hot Springs Historic District may refer to:

in the United States
(by state)
Hot Springs Central Avenue Historic District, Hot Springs, AR, listed on the NRHP in Arkansas
Hot Springs Railroad Warehouse Historic District, Hot Springs, AR, listed on the NRHP in Arkansas
Hot Springs Bathhouse and Commercial Historic District in Truth or Consequences, Truth or Consequences, NM, listed on the NRHP in New Mexico
Hot Springs Historic District (Hot Springs, North Carolina), listed on the NRHP in North Carolina
Hot Springs Historic District (Hot Springs, South Dakota), listed on the NRHP in South Dakota
Indian Hot Springs Health Resort Historic District, Sierra Blanca, TX, listed on the NRHP in Texas
Mammoth Hot Springs Historic District, in Yellowstone National Park, WY, listed on the NRHP
Hot Springs National Park